Predești is a commune in Dolj County, Oltenia, Romania with a population of 3,405. It is composed of three villages: Bucicani, Predești and Predeștii Mici. It included four other villages until 2004, when they were split off to form Pleșoi Commune.

References

Communes in Dolj County
Localities in Oltenia